The following is a list of fiction, including novels, poetry, film and television, which are set in the U.S. state of Oregon.

Literature

Novels 

 Acute Reactions by Ruby Lang
 The Ancient One by T. A. Barron
 Angel's Devil by M. Louis
 Baker City 1948 by George Byron Wright
 The Barn by Avi
 Beezus and Ramona by Beverly Cleary
 Bleeding Heart by Mary Freeman
 Blue Like Jazz by Don Miller
 The Bridge of the Gods: A Romance of Indian Oregon by Frederick Homer Balch
 Children of the River by Linda Crew
 Clean Breaks by Ruby Lang
 Clear and Convincing Proof (Barbara Holloway, Bk 7) by Kate Wilhelm
 Cold Case (Barbara Holloway, Bk 11) by Kate Wilhelm
 The Cove by Catherine Coulter
 Crown Fire by Eloise Jarvis McGraw
 The Crying Tree by Naseem Rakha
 Curiosity Didn't Kill the Cat (Conan Flagg, Bk 1) by M. K. Wren
 Dataman by Tom Mitcheltree
 Days To Remember by Donna Grundman
 Dead By Sunset by Ann Rule
 Dead Matter (Conan Flagg, Bk 7) by M. K. Wren
 Dead Whales Tell No Tales by Ron Lovell
 Deadly Nightshade by Mary Freeman
 A Death at the Rose (Libby Seale, Bk 2) by M. J. Zellnik
 Death of an Artist by Kate Wilhelm
 Death Qualified (Barbara Holloway, Bk 1)  by Kate Wilhelm
 Defense for the Devil (Barbara Holloway, Bk 4) by Kate Wilhelm
 Descent into Madness by Ron Lovell
 Desperate Measures (Barbara Holloway, Bk 6) by Kate Wilhelm
 Devil's Trumpet by Mary Freeman
 Dies the Fire by S. M. Stirling
 Doctor in Buckskin by T. D. Allen
 Doomsday Plus Twelve by James D. Forman
 Down River by Richard Anderson
 Driving to Vernonia by George Byron Wright
 The Drylands by Mary Rosenblum
 Each Bright River by Mildred Masterson McNeilly
 Eating Heaven by Jennie Shortridge
 The Edge by Catherine Coulter
 Ellen Tebbits by Beverly Cleary
  The Emberverse series by S. M. Stirling
 Empty Horizon: A Story of Adventure & Romance in the Northwest by William J. Forest
 Evening's Empire by David Herter
 Everville by Clive Barker
 Every Fixed Star by Jane Kirkpatrick
 Evil at Heart (Archie and Gretchen, Bk 3) by Chelsea Cain
 Failure To Appear by J.A. Jance
 Fifty Shades of Grey by E. L. James
 Fugitives and Refugees: A Walk in Portland, Oregon
 Garden View by Mary Freeman
 A Gathering of Finches by Jane Kirkpatrick
 Geek Love by Katherine Dunn
 Genesis of Shannara by Terry Brooks
 Gideon's Gift by Karen Kingsbury
 A Gift Upon the Shore by M. K. Wren
 Girl by Blake Nelson
 The Girl Who Fell From the Sky by Heidi W. Durrow
 Going to Bend: A Novel by Diane Hammond
 The Golden Telescope: Book One in the Jack and the Magic Hat Maker series by Tracy Partridge-Johnson
 Gone, But Not Forgotten by Phillip Margolin
 Hard Knocks by Ruby Lang
 The Hawkline Monster: A Gothic Western by Richard Brautigan
 Heart of the Beast by Joyce Weatherford
 The Hearts of Horses by Molly Gloss
 Heartsick (Archie and Gretchen, Bk 1) by Chelsea Cain
 Heaven Is High (Barbara Holloway, Bk 12) by Kate Wilhelm
 Henry and Beezus by Beverly Cleary
 Henry and the Clubhouse by Beverly Cleary
 Henry and the Paper Route by Beverly Cleary
 Henry and Ribsy by Beverly Cleary
 Henry Huggins by Beverly Cleary
 Hold Tight the Thread by Jane Kirkpatrick
 Homesick Creek: A Novel by Diane Hammond
 Honey in the Horn by H. L. Davis
 Hot Springs by Shirley Parenteau
 In the Wake of Our Misdeed by George Byron Wright
 Jokerman 8 by Richard Melo
 The Jump-Off Creek by Molly Gloss
 Katie's Gold (Paul Fischer, Bk 2) by Tom Mitcheltree
 Katie's Will  (Paul Fischer, Bk 1) by Tom Mitcheltree
 King of the Mountain  (Conan Flagg, Bk 8) by M. K. Wren
 The Last Dog on Earth by Daniel Ehrenhaft
 Last Go Round by Ken Kesey and Ken Babbs
 The Lathe of Heaven by Ursula K. Le Guin
 Lean On Pete by  Willy Vlautin
 Legasea by Krystalyn Drown
 Lights, Camera, Murder! by Ron Lovell
 Love To Water My Soul by Jane Kirkpatrick
 Malice Prepense  (Barbara Holloway, Bk 3) by Kate Wilhelm
 A Meeting at Corvallis by S. M. Stirling
 Melody Jackson and the House on Lafayette Street by B.M.B. Johnson
 A Mending at the Edge by Jane Kirkpatrick
 The Mirror Pond Murders by Ted Haynes
 Missing, Maybe Dead  (Paul Fischer, Bk 3) by Tom Mitcheltree
 A Multitude of Sins (Conan Flagg, Bk 2) by M. K. Wren
 Murder at the Portland Variety (Libby Seale, Bk 1) by M. J. Zellnik
 Murder at Yaquina Head by Ron Lovell
 Murder in E-Flat Major by Ron Lovell
 Murder Once Done by Mary Lou Bennett
 A Name of Her Own by Jane Kirkpatrick
 A New Life by Bernard Malamud
 Newport Blues by George Byron Wright
 Nightlife by Thomas Perry
 No Defense (Barbara Holloway, Bk 5) by Kate Wilhelm
 Nothing's Certain But Death (Conan Flagg, Bk 4) by M. K. Wren
 Oh, Bury Me Not  (Conan Flagg, Bk 3) by M. K. Wren
 On the Road from Burns by Ted Haynes
 One Flew Over the Cuckoo's Nest by Ken Kesey
 Oregon! by Dana Fuller Ross
 Oregon Bride by F. Rosanne Bittner
 Otis Spofford by Beverly Cleary
 Our Lady of the Forest by David Guterson
 The Outlaw River Wilde by Mike Walters
 Paranoid Park by Blake Nelson
 Piecing Me Together by Renée Watson
 Pink by Gus Van Sant
 Point Hope by Kristen James
 The Postman by David Brin
 The Protector's War by S.M. Stirling
 The Quick and the Thread by Amanda Lee
 Ramona novel series by Beverly Cleary
 Ribsy  by Beverly Cleary
 Ricochet River by Robin Cody
 River Marked by Patricia Briggs
 River of Love by Lisa McConnell
 River Song by Craig Lesley
 The River Why by David James Duncan
 Roseburg 1959 by George Byron Wright
 Safely Home by Randy Alcorn
 Searching for Murder by Ron Lovell
 Searoad by Ursula K. Le Guin
 Seasons of Death (Conan Flagg, Bk 5) by M. K. Wren
 The Shack by William P. Young
 Siskiyou by Richard Hoyt
 The Sisters Brothers by Patrick deWitt
 Skeletons by Kate Wilhelm
 Sky Fisherman by Craig Lesley
 Sleight Of Hand (Barbara Holloway, Bk 9) by Kate Wilhelm
 So the Wind Won't Blow It All Away by Richard Brautigan
 Sometimes a Great Notion by Ken Kesey
 A Song Below Water by Bethany C. Morrow
 The Spells of Lamazee: An Historical Novel of the Pacific Northwest Coast by James Seeley White
 The Steep and Thorny Way by Cat Winters
 Still Wilde in Outlaw River by Mike Walters
 Storm Riders by Craig Lesley
 Suspects by Ted Haynes
 Sweetheart (Archie and Gretchen, Bk 2) by Chelsea Cain
 A Sweetness to the Soul by Jane Kirkpatrick
 A Tendering in the Storm by Jane Kirkpatrick
 This Side of Home by Renée Watson
 Tillamook 1952by George Byron Wright
 A Toke to Success: A Fantasy by Mohammod Ti Riff
 The Torn Skirt by Rebecca Godfrey
 Trask by Don Berry
 Tucket's Home by Gary Paulsen
 The Unbidden Truth (Barbara Holloway, Bk 8) by Kate Wilhelm
 Under Wildwood by Colin Meloy
 Vertical by Rex Pickett
 Violence of Action by Richard Marcinko
 Wake Up, Darlin' Corey (Conan Flagg, Bk 6) by M. K. Wren
 The Way to Life by Benjamin Hoff
 The Way West by A. B. Guthrie, Jr.
 Wild Life by Molly Gloss
 Wildwood by Colin Meloy
 Winterkill by Craig Lesley
 The Wrecker by Clive Cussler
 A Wrongful Death (Barbara Holloway, Bk 10) by Kate Wilhelm
 Yaquina White by Ron Lovell
 Yellow Tape and Coffee by Pat Luther

Graphic novels
 Dead Air by Michael Allred
 iZombie by Chris Roberson and Michael Allred
 Stumptown by Greg Rucka and Matthew Southworth
 Misfit City by Kirsten Smith, Kurt Lustgarten and Naomi Franquiz

Musical 
 Shanghaied in Astoria by the Astor Street Opry Company

Film

Television 
 The Angry Beavers
 Bates Motel, set in Oregon, but filmed in British Columbia
 Best Friends Whenever
 Crash & Bernstein
 Eureka, set in Oregon, but filmed in British Columbia
 Free Agents, set in Portland, but filmed in Los Angeles
 Gravity Falls, set in the Detroit Lake area of Oregon
 Grimm, set and filmed in Portland
 Hello Larry, set in Portland
 Leverage, set in Portland beginning with season 5; filmed in Oregon since season 2
 Life Unexpected, set in Portland, but filmed in Vancouver
 Lost, episode "Not in Portland"
 Marvin Marvin
 Monday Mornings, set in Portland but will be filmed in Los Angeles
 Nowhere Man, filmed in Portland
 The O.C., season 2 premiere partly set in Portland
 Portlandia
 The Simpsons, possibly loosely set in Oregon; many character names are taken from street names in Portland (Flanders, Rev. Lovejoy)
 The Librarians (TV/Movie Series)
 Under Suspicion
 The X-Files, pilot episode set in Bellefleur, but filmed in British Columbia
 Everything Sucks!, takes place in Boring.

Video games
 Fallout 2
 Gone Home
 Life Is Strange
 Life is Strange: Before the Storm
 The Oregon Trail
 Days Gone
 Lighthouse: The Dark Being

See also 
 Music of Oregon
 List of artists and art institutions in Portland, Oregon
 Lists of Oregon-related topics

References

External links 
"Reading Portland: The City in Prose", The Portland Mercury

Fiction
Oregon in fiction
Lists of television series by setting
Fiction